The Brown Bears represented Brown University in ECAC women's ice hockey during the 2014–15 NCAA Division I women's ice hockey season.

Offseason
July 15: Seventeen players honoroed with placement on ECAC All-Academic Team.

Recruiting

Roster

Schedule

|-
!colspan=12 style="background:#381C00; color:white;"| Regular Season

References

Brown
2014 in sports in Rhode Island
2015 in sports in Rhode Island
Brown Bears women's ice hockey seasons